Red to Kill is a 1994 category III Hong Kong horror film directed by Billy Tang Hin-Shing.

Cast and roles
 Lily Chung - Ming-Ming Yuk Kong
 Money Lo - Ka Lok Cheung, the social worker
 Ben Ng - Chi Wai Chan
 Bobby Yip - Mental patient

References

External links
 
 lovehkfilm entry

1994 films
1990s Cantonese-language films
Films directed by Billy Tang
Films about rape
Films about intellectual disability
1994 horror films
Hong Kong horror films
1990s Hong Kong films